Igor Potapovich (Игорь Потапович; born September 6, 1967 in Almaty) is a former pole vault athlete from Kazakhstan. Potapovich won his first World Junior Championship in 1986. He won the World Cup in 1992.  He also finished second at the 1995 IAAF World Indoor Championships and became the indoor World Champion two years later in 1997.

Potapovich also won the Asian Games in 1994 and the 1998. Potapovich finished 4th at the 1996 Olympic Games and did not make the finals of the 2000 Olympic Games. His personal best was 5.92 metres.

International competitions

1Representing Asia

External links
 

1967 births
Living people
Sportspeople from Almaty
Kazakhstani male pole vaulters
Soviet male pole vaulters
Olympic male pole vaulters
Olympic athletes of Kazakhstan
Athletes (track and field) at the 1996 Summer Olympics
Athletes (track and field) at the 2000 Summer Olympics
Asian Games gold medalists for Kazakhstan
Asian Games gold medalists in athletics (track and field)
Athletes (track and field) at the 1994 Asian Games
Athletes (track and field) at the 1998 Asian Games
Medalists at the 1994 Asian Games
Medalists at the 1998 Asian Games
Competitors at the 1990 Goodwill Games
World Athletics Championships athletes for Kazakhstan
World Athletics Indoor Championships winners
World Athletics U20 Championships winners
Asian Athletics Championships winners
Japan Championships in Athletics winners
Kazakhstani people of Russian descent